Dear Sister is the tenth studio album from bluegrass musician Claire Lynch. The album reached No. 9 on the Bluegrass Album chart in Billboard magazine. The track, "Dear Sister", won the 2014 International Bluegrass Music Association award for Song of the Year.

History
The song "Dear Sister" is based on author Frank Anderson Chappel and his 2002 book Dear Sister: Civil War Letters to a Sister in Alabama. The sister detailed in the book is an ancestor of author Chappel. Album co-writer Louisa Branscomb also has a connection similar to that of Chappel. Branscomb has a great-great aunt who had four brothers in the civil war, all of whom wrote letters to her which she saved after being found in the 20th Century.

Track listing

Chart performance

References

2013 albums
Claire Lynch albums
Compass Records albums